Miyuki Takemura (born 25 July 1989) is a Japanese swimmer. She competed in the women's 50 metre backstroke event at the 2018 FINA World Swimming Championships (25 m), in Hangzhou, China.

References

External links
 

1989 births
Living people
Japanese female backstroke swimmers
Place of birth missing (living people)
Asian Games medalists in swimming
Asian Games bronze medalists for Japan
Swimmers at the 2014 Asian Games
Medalists at the 2014 Asian Games